The 1987–88 Associate Members' Cup, known as the 1987–88 Sherpa Van Trophy for sponsorship reasons, was the 5th staging of the Associate Members' Cup, a knockout competition for English football clubs in the Third and Fourth Divisions (now known as League One and Two).

The winners were Wolverhampton Wanderers, who defeated Burnley 2–0 in the final. This marked the first time two previous English champions have met in the final of this competition, and made Wolves the first former champions to have won the trophy, Portsmouth the only other having won the EFL trophy in 2019.

The competition began on 13 October 1987 and ended with the final on 29 May 1988.
The tournament begins with clubs divided into a Northern and a Southern section, and teams entering a preliminary group stage. Each section then gradually eliminates the qualifying teams in knock-out fashion until each has a winning finalist. At this point, the two winning finalists faced each other in the combined final for the honour of the trophy.

Preliminary round

Northern Section 

|-
! colspan=4 | Play-off to determine second place:
|-

Southern Section

First round

Northern Section

Southern Section

Quarter-finals

Northern Section

Southern Section

Area semi-finals

Northern Section

Southern Section

Area finals

Northern Area final

Burnley won 3–1 on aggregate.

Southern Area final

Wolverhampton Wanderers won 4–1 on aggregate.

Final

External links
Official website

1987-88
Tro
1987–88 domestic association football cups